Olubunmi is a Yoruba given name meaning "gift of God". Other variations of the names are Bunmi and Oluwabunmi. Notable people with this name include:

 Anthony Olubunmi Okogie, Catholic cardinal
 Olubunmi Akinlade, Nigerian Anglican bishop
 Olubunmi Ayodeji Adetunmbi, Nigerian politician
 Olubunmi Olateru-Olagbegi, former Chief judge of Ondo State
 Ogunlola Olubunmi, Nigerian politician
 Olubunmi Owoso, Nigerian academic
 Olubunmi Tunji-Ojo, Nigerian politician

Film 

 Mercy Olubunmi, fictional character in EastEnders

References 

Yoruba-language surnames
Surnames